Oluwafemi Ajisafe is a Nigerian academic, sport enthusiast and the current vice chancellor of Afe Babalola University, Ado Ekiti, Ekiti. He is also the first Professor of Sports Science and Physical Education in Nigeria.

Early life and Career
Ajisafe obtained a Doctorate degree in Sport Science from Temple University, Philadelphia. He is also the first Professor of Sport Science and Physical Education in Nigeria.
He has served as a member of several accrediting agency and is also the first Nigerian Director for the International Council of Sports Science and Physical Education, Berlin.

References

Living people
Vice-Chancellors of Nigerian universities
Temple University alumni
Year of birth missing (living people)